Ídolos is a Portuguese reality television show based on the popular British show Pop Idol. The show is a contest to determine the best young singer in Portugal. The first two seasons were hosted by Sílvia Alberto and Pedro Granger. The show, then went to a sort of hiatus, and, after only a lukewarm reaction by the viewers for season two, the show has officially been replaced by another casting show on its broadcast station, Família Superstar, which ended in 2008.

After an absence for four years the show returned for a third season to SIC in fall 2009 now with João Manzarra and Cláudia Vieira hosting. Season 3 finished in February 2010, and Season 4 started in September.

Ídolos had three audition cities to find the best talent in all of Portugal, including: Porto, Beja and Lisbon. However, in the third and fourth seasons, auditions were made in Porto, Lisbon, Aveiro, Portimão and Estoril. The show did not return in fall 2011 but instead returned in 2012. The show is currently on hiatus since late 2012, since then their timeslot for 2013 has been taken over by Factor X, the Portuguese version of The X Factor.

Hosts
In the first and second season:
 Pedro Granger
 Sílvia Alberto

In the third, fourth and fifth season:
 Cláudia Vieira
 João Manzarra

Jury
In the first and second season:
 Sofia Morais
 Manuel Moura dos Santos
 Luis Jardim
 Ramón Galarza

In the third and fourth season:
 Manuel Moura dos Santos
 Laurent Filipe
 Roberta Medina
 Pedro Boucherie Mendes

In the fifth season:
 Manuel Moura dos Santos
 Bárbara Guimarães
 Tony Carreira
 Pedro Abrunhosa

Season 1

Semifinal qualifiers
Top 30

Format: three out of ten making the final each week and one Wildcard

Notes:
 Because Mariline Hortigueira withdrew Nádia Pimentel, who placed 4th in group 3, replaced her in the top 10.

Finals elimination chart
Top 10

 Nuno Norte was crowned the first Portugal Idol on 2 January 2004. Ricardo Oliveira came in second place.
 In third place, we have had a woman. Luísa Sobral may have come in 3rd place, but nowadays, she is a popular and known artist and has also done an album. Luísa Sobral is Salvador Sobral's sister (7th place in season 3).

Elimination chart

Season 2

Elimination chart

 After the show, Luciana Abreu and Raquel Guerra participated in "Floribella". Later, Raquel has participated in "Família Superstar". And even later, Luciana won the second season of "A Tua Cara Não me é Estranha".

Season 3

Season 4

Season 5

Season 6

Season 7

References

External links
 Ídolos 2012 – Season 5 Official website
 Ídolos 2010 – Season 4 Official website
 Ídolos 2009 – Season 3 Official website
 Ídolos 2004 – Season 2 Official website
 Ídolos 2003 – Season 1 Official website
  – Idolos announced and how to apply for it

 
2000s Portuguese television series
2010s Portuguese television series
2003 Portuguese television series debuts
2005 Portuguese television series endings
2009 Portuguese television series debuts
Television series by Fremantle (company)
Sociedade Independente de Comunicação original programming
Portuguese television series based on British television series